Parama Veera Chakra is a 2011 Indian Telugu-language action film produced by C. Kalyan on Teja Cinema banner and directed by Dasari Narayana Rao as his 150th film. Starring Nandamuri Balakrishna, Nagineedu, Ameesha Patel, Neha Dhupia, Sheela Kaur and Jayasudha. The music is composed by Mani Sharma.

The film released during the 2011 Sankranthi weekend to poor reviews. However, it won the Sarojini Devi Award for a Film on National Integration at the 2010 Nandi Awards.

Synopsis
Chakradhar is an actor though his mother doesn't approve of his celebrity status. Instead, she yearns to see her son as a Major in the Army, true to the promise she has given to Bobbili Puli. As Chakradhar dons various roles, an army Colonel Jeetendra tells him that he has a story in which he wants Chakradhar to act. The Colonel narrates to him a story of an army major – Major Jaya Simha. However, there is a catch. Major Jaya Simha is not a fictional character, but a real-time army man who is a lookalike of Chakradhar, and valiantly arrested a dreaded terrorist – Abdul Ghani. The tragedy is Jaya Simha is now in a vegetative state (on mechanical ventilation), thanks to a conspiracy plotted by politicians, a few army men, and terrorists themselves. Colonel Jeetendra asks Chakradhar to act like Major to ensure that the nation's security plans are not compromised. How Chakradhar attacks the terrorists and how he brings back the honor of the Major form the rest of the story.

Cast

Soundtrack

The soundtrack and background score is composed by Mani Sharma. The audio was released on 29 December 2010. The audio function of the movie is held at Shilpakala Vedika in Hyderabad. The audio rights of the soundtrack were purchased by Aditya Music.

References

External links

2011 films
2010s Telugu-language films
2010s action war films
Indian action war films
Films directed by Dasari Narayana Rao
Films scored by Mani Sharma
Films about filmmaking
Indian Army in films